Deer Valley may refer to:

Deer Valley, a ski resort in Utah
Deer Valley, Phoenix, a neighborhood (urban village) in Phoenix, Arizona